Evrotas is a municipality in the Laconia regional unit, Peloponnese, Greece. It is named after the river Eurotas. The seat of the municipality is the town Skala. The municipality has an area of 811.734 km2.

Municipality
The municipality Evrotas was formed at the 2011 local government reform by the merger of the following 5 former municipalities, that became municipal units:
Elos
Geronthres
Krokees
Niata
Skala

Elevation
Some areas in the south part of the municipality have a negative elevation reaching up to -3.3 meters below the sea level.

References

Municipalities of Peloponnese (region)
Populated places in Laconia